Kinski may refer to:

Klaus Kinski né Nakszynski (1926–1991), German actor
Pola Kinski (born 1952), German actress, daughter of Klaus
Nastassja Kinski (born 1961), German-born model and actress, daughter of Klaus
Kenya Kinski-Jones (born 1993), model, daughter of Nastassja Kinski and Quincy Jones
Nikolai Kinski (born 1976), actor, son of Klaus and half-brother of Nastassja
Debora Caprioglio, (born 1968), formerly known as Debora Kinski, Italian actress and ex-wife of Klaus
Kinski (band), a post-rock group from Seattle, WA
Katya, Rachel and Zeke Kinski, characters from Australian soap opera Neighbours,  or their stepmother Susan

See also
 House of Kinsky